Ecrobia maritima is a species of very small aquatic snail, an operculate gastropod mollusk in the family Hydrobiidae.

Description
The size of an adult shell reaches 4 mm.

Distribution
Ecrobia maritima live in Pomorie Lake, a hyperhaline lagoon in eastern Bulgaria. Western Europe, Tunisia, the Peloponnesus and the Corinthian Gulf, all in the Ionian Sea, as well as — shockingly — the Black Sea coast in Romania, are habitats for E. ventrosa. Both the Black Sea and the Aegean Sea have been home to E. maritima.

References

 Kevrekidis T., Wilke T. & Mogias A. (2005). When DNA puts ecological works back on the right track: genetic assessment and distribution patterns of mudsnail populations in the Evros Delta lagoons. Archiv für Hydrobiologie vol. 162(1): 19-35

External links

Hydrobiidae
Ecrobia
Gastropods described in 1916